Rudecindo Alvarado (March 1, 1792 – June 22, 1872) was an Argentine general. He fought in the military campaigns of Manuel Belgrano, and in the Army of the Andes. He was governor of Mendoza. He left the country during the rule of Juan Manuel de Rosas, and returned in 1852 after Rosas' defeat at the battle of Caseros.

Notes

Governors of Mendoza Province
Argentine generals
People of the Argentine War of Independence
Unitarianists (Argentina)
1792 births
1872 deaths
Argentine exiles